Sammis is a given and surname derived from Samways, which originated in Dorset, England. Richard Samways was a probable passenger of the Mary and John in 1630, who settled in Windsor, Connecticut and the spelling of the name subsequently changed to Sammis.

Notable people with the given name Sammis 
 Sammis Reyes

Notable people with the surname Sammis 
 Ida Sammis
 John H. Sammis
 John Merritt Sammis

References 

Surnames
Given names